The Girl in the Rain is a 1920 American silent mystery film directed by Rollin S. Sturgeon and starring Anne Cornwall, Lloyd Bacon and Jessalyn Van Trump.

Cast
 Anne Cornwall as Judith 
 Lloyd Bacon as Walter 
 Jessalyn Van Trump as Vera 
 Jim Farley as Max Williams
 George Kunkel as Jim West 
 James Liddy as Boone 
 Neil Hardin as Bill Cortwright

References

Bibliography
 Ken Wlaschin. Silent Mystery and Detective Movies: A Comprehensive Filmography. McFarland, 2009.

External links
 

1920 films
1920 mystery films
American silent feature films
American mystery films
Films directed by Rollin S. Sturgeon
American black-and-white films
Universal Pictures films
1920s English-language films
1920s American films
Silent mystery films